Mark Mason (born 6 June 1969) is a retired Guyanese long jumper.

He competed at the 1992 Olympic Games, but without reaching the final.

His personal best jump was 8.07 metres, achieved in April 1993 in Raleigh.

References

1969 births
Living people
Guyanese long jumpers
Athletes (track and field) at the 1987 Pan American Games
Pan American Games competitors for Guyana
Athletes (track and field) at the 1990 Commonwealth Games
Commonwealth Games competitors for Guyana
Athletes (track and field) at the 1992 Summer Olympics
Olympic athletes of Guyana
Male long jumpers
Guyanese male athletes